Green Park Historic District is a national historic district located at Blowing Rock in  Caldwell County and Watauga County, North Carolina.  The district includes 46 contributing buildings, three contributing sites, and 2two contributing structures associated with a residential summer resort in the town of Blowing Rock.  It includes buildings largely built in the 1920s, in a variety of popular architectural styles including Bungalow / American Craftsman, Colonial Revival and Queen Anne.  Notable contributing resources include the McDowell Cottage, Mt. Bethel Reformed Church, Blowing Rock Reception Center/Gift Shop, Robert A. Dunn Cottage, Gideon's Ridge, the James Ross Cannon House, the David Ovens Cottage, Blowing Rock, and the Blowing Rock Country Club Golf Course.  Located in the district and separately listed is the Green Park Inn (1891).

The district was listed on the National Register of Historic Places in 1994.

References

Historic districts on the National Register of Historic Places in North Carolina
Queen Anne architecture in North Carolina
Colonial Revival architecture in North Carolina
Buildings and structures in Caldwell County, North Carolina
National Register of Historic Places in Caldwell County, North Carolina
Buildings and structures in Watauga County, North Carolina
National Register of Historic Places in Watauga County, North Carolina